Admiral Rowley may refer to:

Bartholomew Rowley (1764–1811), British Royal Navy admiral
Sir Charles Rowley, 1st Baronet (1770–1845), British Royal Navy admiral
Joshua Rowley (1734–1790), British Royal Navy vice admiral
Josias Rowley (1765–1842), British Royal Navy admiral
William Rowley (Royal Navy officer) (c. 1690–1768), British Royal Navy admiral

See also
Rafe Grenville Rowley-Conwy (1875–1951), British Royal Navy rear admiral